Democratic Left was a post-communist political organisation in the United Kingdom during the 1990s, growing out of the Eurocommunist strand within the Communist Party of Great Britain and its magazine Marxism Today (which closed around the same time).

It was established in 1991 when the CPGB decided to reform itself into a left-leaning reformist political multi-issue grassroots think-tank based on the party's Manifesto for New Times. Its secretary was Nina Temple, the last general secretary of the CPGB.

Some members of the CPGB disagreed with this decision and joined the Communist Party of Britain, which had broken away from the CPGB in 1988, while some Scottish members formed the Communist Party of Scotland.

Worldview
Democratic Left stated a belief in a pluralist and socialist society "incompatible with the structures and values of capitalism." Beginning as a political party, it decided not to stand candidates but instead to support tactical voting against the Conservatives at the 1992 general election and soon become a non-party campaigning organisation. DL campaigned on modernising unions, including Unions21; anti-racism and cultural diversity; democratising Britain, including Make Votes Count; social exclusion and poverty, including the Social Exclusion Network; focusing on coalition building, and operating in effect as a 'socialist anti-Conservative front'.

A series of policy magazines titled Futures were published in 1997 as the group tried to stem falling membership. Members of the Trotskyist-dominated Socialist Alliance tried to join in 1998, but were blocked after legal action was taken, and the decision was taken to stop being "stuck in the swamp of sectarian politics." Democratic Left in England and Wales was dissolved and reformed as the New Times Network in December 1998, open to members of Labour and other political parties. It published a monthly magazine, New Times, and collaborated with the Fabian Society on the 'Getting Real' conference in June 1999. New Times Network became the New Politics Network in December 1999. In Scotland it continues as Democratic Left Scotland, founded in May 1998.

See also
 Democratic Party of the Left - post-communists in Italy
 Party of Democratic Socialism - post-communists in Germany
 SEARCH Foundation - post-communists in Australia

References

External links

Democratic Left on the Internet Archive

1991 establishments in the United Kingdom
1998 disestablishments in the United Kingdom
Communist Party of Great Britain
Defunct political parties in the United Kingdom
Political and economic think tanks based in the United Kingdom
Communist Party of Great Britain breakaway groups
Far-left political parties in the United Kingdom